Water is Basic is a non-profit NGO that drills clean water wells in South Sudan. The organization was founded in 2006 during a meeting of Sudanese church leaders, who decided that the local church's first steps after the signing of the Comprehensive Peace Agreement ought to be fulfilling physical needs. It is estimated that between 50% and 60% of the population of South Sudan has access to an improved water source, such as a hand pump, a protected well or – for a small minority – piped water supply.

Water is Basic is the largest clean water non-profit organization in South Sudan.

Water is Basic completed its first well on June 28, 2008 and has since completed over 500 boreholes and repaired 75 others to working condition throughout states of Central and Western Equatoria and Jonglei. Currently, Water is Basic is led by Bishop Elias Taban, founder of the Sudan Evangelical Presbyterian Church and 2013 Clinton Global Citizen Award by the Clinton Foundation recipient.

On March 10, 2014, Water is Basic and the Permanent Mission of South Sudan to the United Nations hosted an event, titled "Women and Water in South Sudan," as a contribution to the 58th United Nations Commission on the Status of Women. In August 2014, Water is Basic leaders joined 91 other individuals and organizations — including former US government officials, members of the UK Parliament, and leaders of advocacy and humanitarian organizations — to sign a letter sent to South Sudan's President Salva Kiir and former Vice President Dr. Riek Machar urging an end to the violence between the government and opposition leaders.

Operations

Water is Basic owns and operates two drilling rigs in South Sudan, run by two different crews. The decisions for where the wells are drilled are made by a combination of local Water is Basic staff and local leadership. Irving Bible Church, a nondenominational church in Irving, Texas, raised $1.7 million for the initial costs of purchasing the rigs, then signed over the equipment to the leadership in South Sudan. Today, Water is Basic raises money and awareness around the United States by showing their self-produced documentary short film, "RU: Water is Life."

References

Development charities based in the United States
Foreign charities operating in South Sudan
Water-related charities
Charities based in Texas